La Fanfarlo is a work by French poet Charles Baudelaire, first published in January 1847.   The novella describes a fictionalised account of the writer's love affair with a dancer, Jeanne Duval.

Irish literary critic Enid Starkie, known for her biographical works on French poets, said about La Fanfarlo:

References

External links
La Fanfarlo : full online readable and downloadable text.
 Charles Baudelaire—Largest site dedicated to Baudelaire's poems and prose, containing Fleurs du mal, Petit poemes et prose, Fanfarlo and more in French.

1847 French novels
Works by Charles Baudelaire
French novellas